Iglesia de San Martín (Pereda) is a parish church in Pereda (Grado) within the Municipality of Grado in Asturias, Spain. The church was established in the 12th century. The building in an example of Romanesque architecture.

See also
Asturian art
Catholic Church in Spain

References

12th-century Roman Catholic church buildings in Spain
Churches in Asturias
Romanesque architecture in Asturias